Micaela Nevárez (born January 1, 1972, in Carolina, Puerto Rico) is a Puerto Rican actress who has appeared in independent and European films. She made her film debut in the Spanish film Princesas which was directed by Fernando León de Aranoa, in which she played Zulema, an illegal immigrant from the Dominican Republic trying to make a living as a prostitute on the streets of Madrid, Spain. Her performance in this film earned her a Goya Award for Best New Actress in 2006, making her the first Puerto Rican actress to win this notable award.

Biography 
Born in Carolina, Puerto Rico, Nevárez was educated in local military schools in order to improve her English. At the age of 10, her parents decided to relocate to New York City, where she focused her education to prepare her for a medical career. However, on the side she continued to dabble in the arts as a hobby.  It was her stepfather who changed her mind and help encouraged her to follow her dreams and desire to become an actress.

Fate stepped in when she was discovered by director Fernando León de Aranoa who was in New York promoting his latest film Lunes al Sol starring acclaimed Spanish actor Javier Bardem.  Nevárez, who frequented a popular bar/restaurant called "Oliva" in lower Manhattan on their popular salsa music nights, captured the director's attention so much that he asked her to audition for a role in his upcoming film.  Due to the recent death of her stepfather, she at first declined his offer and recommended a friend for the role, however, after the director personally had Bardem (an actor whom she greatly admires) deliver the script to her in person, did she accept his offer.  After some initial conversations, she was flown to Spain for some screen tests.

On the evening of January 29, 2006, in the presence of thousands of Spain's top artists and directors, Nevárez beat four other actresses in being named Best New Actress at the 20th Goya Awards which were held in Madrid's Palacio Municipal de Congresos. By winning this award, Nevárez became the first Puerto Rican performer to win this prestigious film honor and one of the few Latin American actresses to do so as well.

The news of her win reached her native Puerto Rico immediately where she was honored with an audience with Governor Aníbal Acevedo Vilá in the La Fortaleza, who congratulated her on her win.

As of 2008, she resided with her French husband in London. Nevárez  launched her film career in the United States with a supporting role in the independent film The War Boys starring Victor Rasuk and Peter Gallagher. Nevárez played Marta, Rasuk's love interest in the 2009 film, which was based on a play by Naomi Wallace.

References

External links 
  Micaela Nevárez on the Internet Movie Database
  Institute of Puerto Rican Culture article – February 3, 2006
  Institute of Puerto Rican Culture article – September 15, 2006
  Interview with 20minutos.es
   El Mundo's Goya 2006 Awards nomination profile

1972 births
Living people
People from Carolina, Puerto Rico
21st-century Puerto Rican actresses
Puerto Rican expatriates in England